The Cayenne jay (Cyanocorax cayanus) is a species of bird in the family Corvidae.
It is found in Brazil, French Guiana, Guyana, Suriname, and Venezuela.
Its natural habitats are subtropical or tropical moist lowland forest, subtropical or tropical dry shrubland, and heavily degraded former forest.

In 1760 the French zoologist Mathurin Jacques Brisson included a description of the Cayenne jay in his Ornithologie based on a specimen collected in Cayenne, French Guiana. He used the French name Le geay de Cayenne and the Latin Garrulus Cayanensis. Although Brisson coined Latin names, these do not conform to the binomial system and are not recognised by the International Commission on Zoological Nomenclature. When in 1766 the Swedish naturalist Carl Linnaeus updated his Systema Naturae for the twelfth edition, he added 240 species that had been previously described by Brisson. One of these was the Cayenne jay. Linnaeus included a brief description, coined the binomial name Corvus cayanus and cited Brisson's work. This species is now placed in the genus Cyanocorax that was introduced by the German zoologist Friedrich Boie in 1826. No subspecies are recognised.

References

Cayenne jay
Birds of the Guianas
Cayenne jay
Cayenne jay
Taxonomy articles created by Polbot